Amselina virgo is a moth of the family Autostichidae which is endemic to Crete.

References

Moths described in 1959
Amselina
Moths of Europe
Endemic arthropods of Crete